Vladimír Karas (22 May 1927 – 19 June 2003) was a Czech gymnast. He competed in eight events at the 1948 Summer Olympics.

References

External links
 

1927 births
2003 deaths
Czech male artistic gymnasts
Olympic gymnasts of Czechoslovakia
Gymnasts at the 1948 Summer Olympics
Gymnasts from Prague